Abraham Fortas (June 19, 1910 – April 5, 1982) was an American lawyer and jurist who served as an associate justice of the Supreme Court of the United States from 1965 to 1969. Born and raised in Memphis, Tennessee, Fortas graduated from Rhodes College and Yale Law School. He later became a law professor at Yale Law School and then an advisor for the U.S. Securities and Exchange Commission. Fortas worked at the Department of the Interior under President Franklin D. Roosevelt, and was appointed by President Harry S. Truman to delegations that helped set up the United Nations in 1945.

In 1948, Fortas represented Lyndon B. Johnson in the hotly contested Democratic senatorial second primary electoral dispute, and he formed close ties with the president-to-be. Fortas also represented Clarence Earl Gideon before the U.S. Supreme Court, in a landmark case involving the right to counsel. Nominated by Johnson to the Supreme Court in 1965, Fortas was confirmed by the Senate, and maintained a close working relationship with the president. As a Justice, Fortas wrote several notable majority opinions including Tinker v. Des Moines Independent Community School District.

In 1968, Johnson tried to elevate Fortas to the position of chief justice of the Supreme Court, but that nomination faced a filibuster and was withdrawn. Fortas later resigned from the Court after a controversy involving his acceptance of $20,000 from financier Louis Wolfson while Wolfson was being investigated for insider trading. The Justice Department including future Chief Justice William Rehnquist investigated Fortas at the behest of President Richard Nixon who saw the idea of removing Fortas as a chance to move the Court in a more conservative direction, and Attorney General John N. Mitchell pressured Fortas into resigning. After retirement, Fortas returned to private practice, sometimes appearing before the justices with whom he had served.

Early years
Fortas was born the youngest of five children to Orthodox Jewish immigrants Woolfe Fortas and Rachel "Ray" Berzansky Fortas in Memphis, Tennessee. Woolfe was born in Russia, and Rachel was born in Lithuania. Woolfe was a cabinetmaker, and the couple operated a store together. Fortas acquired a lifelong love for music from his father, who encouraged his playing the violin, and was known in Memphis as "Fiddlin' Abe Fortas". Fortas learned to play the violin from local Catholic nuns at the St. Patrick's School next to his house and then studied chamber music with the leader of a local trio. Fortas attended South Side High School where, at the age of sixteen, he graduated second in his class in 1926. After graduating from high school, Fortas won a scholarship to attend Southwestern at Memphis, a liberal arts college now called Rhodes College. During his college years, Fortas supported himself by working as a shoe salesman and as a performing violinist, while also giving violin lessons to local children. At first, Fortas considered studying music, before settling on English and political science and graduated first in his class in 1930.

Fortas earned scholarships from both Harvard Law School and Yale Law School but ultimately decided to attend Yale, becoming the youngest law student there at 20 years old. He became editor-in-chief of the Yale Law Journal and graduated cum laude and second in the class of 1933. One of his professors, William O. Douglas, was impressed with Fortas, and Douglas arranged for Fortas to stay at Yale to become an assistant professor of law.

Shortly thereafter, Douglas took on a series of government positions, including with the Agricultural Adjustment Administration and the U.S. Securities and Exchange Commission (SEC) in Washington, D.C.  In 1937, he was made assistant director of the public utilities division at the SEC. Throughout this period, Fortas commuted between New Haven and Washington in order to fulfill his responsibilities to Yale and the government.

Personal life

In 1935, Fortas married Carolyn E. Agger, who became a successful tax lawyer. They had no children, and after his appointment to the Supreme Court of the United States, they lived at 3210 R Street NW in the Georgetown section of Washington, D.C.

Fortas was an amateur musician who played the violin in a quartet, called the "N Street Strictly-no-refunds String Quartet" on Sunday evenings. It often included prominent musicians passing through town, such as Isaac Stern. Fortas was a good friend of the first democratically elected Governor of Puerto Rico, Luis Muñoz Marín, calling him "a spectacularly great figure". Fortas visited the island often, frequently lobbied for the island's interests in Congress, participated in drafting the Constitution of Puerto Rico, and gave legal advice to Marín's administration whenever requested.

The Puerto Rican actor José Ferrer portrayed Fortas in the film Gideon's Trumpet (1980).

Early career
Leaving Yale in 1939, Fortas served as general counsel of the Public Works Administration and then as Undersecretary of the Interior in Franklin D. Roosevelt's administration. While he was working at the U.S. Department of the Interior, the Secretary of the Interior, Harold L. Ickes, introduced him to a young congressman from Texas, Lyndon B. Johnson.

In 1945, Fortas was granted a leave of absence from the Department of Interior to join the Armed Forces of the United States. According to his official biography, within a month, Fortas was discharged because of an arrested case of ocular tuberculosis. Later in 1945, he was appointed by President Harry S. Truman as an advisor to the U.S. delegation during the organizational meeting of the United Nations (UN) in San Francisco, and at the 1946 General Assembly meeting in London.

Private practice
In 1946, after leaving government service, Fortas founded a law firm, Arnold & Fortas, with Thurman Arnold. Former Federal Communications Commission commissioner Paul A. Porter joined the firm in 1947, and after the appointment of Fortas to the Supreme Court, the firm was renamed Arnold & Porter. For many years, it has been one of Washington's most influential law firms, and today is among the largest law firms in the world.

In the 1948 United States Senate election in Texas, Lyndon Johnson ran for the Democratic nomination for one of the two seats in the U.S. Senate from Texas. Johnson won the Democratic primary by only 87 votes. His opponent, former Governor of Texas Coke R. Stevenson, persuaded a federal judge to issue an order taking Johnson's name off the general election ballot while the primary results were being contested. There were serious allegations of corruption in the voting process, including 200 votes for Johnson that had been cast in alphabetical order. Johnson asked Fortas for help, and Fortas persuaded Supreme Court Justice Hugo Black to overturn the ruling. Johnson then won the general election and became a U.S. Senator.

During the Red Scare of the late 1940s and early 1950s, Fortas came to widespread notice as the defense attorney for Owen Lattimore. In 1950, Fortas often clashed with Senator Joseph McCarthy when representing Lattimore before the Tydings Committee, and also before the Senate Internal Security Subcommittee.

Fortas initially opposed the creation of a presidential commission to investigate the assassination of President John F. Kennedy. When it became clear that multiple investigations were gearing up simultaneously at the city, state, and federal levels, Fortas changed his mind and advised Johnson to establish the Warren Commission.

Durham v. United States
Fortas was known in Washington circles to have a serious interest in psychiatry, still a controversial subject at the time. In 1953, this expertise led to his appointment to represent the indigent Monte W. Durham, whose insanity defense had been rejected at trial two years earlier, before a U.S. Court of Appeals.

Durham's defense had been denied because the District Court had applied the M'Naghten Rules, requiring that the defense prove the accused did not know the difference between right and wrong for an insanity plea to be accepted. Adopted by the British House of Lords in 1843, generations before the origins of modern psychiatry, this test was still in common use in American courts over a century later.

The effect of this standard was to exclude psychiatric and psychological testimony almost entirely from the legal process. In a critical turning point for American criminal law, the Court of Appeals accepted Fortas's call to abandon the M'Naghten Rule and to allow for testimony and evidence regarding the defendant's mental state.

Gideon v. Wainwright
In 1963, Fortas represented Clarence Earl Gideon in his appeal before the Supreme Court. Gideon, had been convicted by a Florida court of breaking into a pool hall. He could not afford a lawyer, and none was provided for him when he asked for one at trial. In its landmark ruling in Gideon v. Wainwright, the Supreme Court held for Gideon, ruling that state courts are required under the Sixth Amendment to provide counsel in criminal cases for defendants unable to afford their own. Fortas's former Yale Law School professor, longtime friend and future Supreme Court colleague, William O. Douglas praised his argument as "probably the best single legal argument" in his 36 years on the court.

Associate Justice of the Supreme Court

On July 28, 1965,  President Johnson nominated Fortas as an associate justice of the United States Supreme Court, to succeed Arthur Goldberg, who had resigned to become the U.S. Ambassador to the United Nations following the death of Adlai Stevenson. Johnson persuaded Goldberg to leave the Court for the U.N. in part because he wanted Fortas on the Court. Johnson thought that some of his "Great Society" reforms could be ruled unconstitutional by the Court and felt that Fortas would let him know if that was to happen. The nomination was given a favorable recommendation by the Senate Judiciary Committee two weeks later, following a one-day public hearing. He was confirmed by the U.S. Senate on August 11, 1965, and took the judicial oath of office on October 4, 1965. His appointment ensured the continuation of the Warren Court's liberal majority.

The seat Fortas occupied on the Court had come to be informally known as the "Jewish seat," as his three immediate predecessors—Goldberg, plus Felix Frankfurter and Benjamin Cardozo before him—were also Jewish.

Fortas continued to serve as an adviser to Johnson after becoming an associate justice. He attended White House staff meetings, advising the president on judicial nominations and discussed private Supreme Court deliberations with him. In 1966, he substantially edited an initial version of Johnson's State of the Union Address.

In 1968, Fortas wrote a book called Concerning Dissent and Civil Disobedience.

Fortas's law clerks included former Under Secretary of Defense for Policy Walter B. Slocombe and Martha A. Field, a scholar of constitutional law, family law, and bioethics.

Relationship with other justices

Fortas had mostly good working relations with his fellow justices although they worried that he talked to President Johnson too much. Fortas clashed with his fellow Associate Justice Hugo Black during much of his time on the Court. The two had been friends since the 1930s, and Black helped Fortas's wife Agger consent to his appointment to the Supreme Court. However, once both men were on the Court, they disagreed about the manner in which the Constitution should be interpreted and found themselves on opposing sides in the Court's opinions most of the time. In 1968, a Warren clerk called their feud "one of the most basic animosities of the Court".

Fortas's best relationship was with William O. Douglas, his former law professor at Yale. Fortas was also close to Associate Justice William J. Brennan and Chief Justice Earl Warren. Brennan's offices were in the chambers next to those of Fortas. Fortas's wife recalled that Fortas "loved Warren".

Fortas called John Marshall Harlan II "one of my dearest friends, although we usually are on opposite sides of the issues here."

In 1967, Fortas and Douglas dissented in the 5–4 decision Fortson v. Morris, which cleared the path for the Georgia State Legislature to choose the Governor of Georgia in the deadlocked Georgia gubernatorial election of 1966 between the Democrat Lester Maddox and the Republican Howard Callaway. Fortas said that the State Constitution of 1824, allowing the legislature to choose the governor if no one wins a majority in the general election, was at odds with the equal protection clause of the 14th Amendment to the U.S. Constitution:  In this case, Maddox trailed Callaway by about 3,000 votes.

On the other hand, Justice Black took the strict constructionist view that the U.S. Constitution does not dictate how a state must choose its governor:

Approach to oral arguments

Fortas was critical of justices (he specifically cited Thurgood Marshall) who frequently broke into attorneys' arguments to ask questions. As an attorney arguing before the Court, he had resented intrusions by the justices and so as a justice himself, he felt it best to let the lawyers give their arguments uninterrupted.

Children's and students' rights

During his time on the Court, Fortas led a revolution in US juvenile justice, broadly extending the Court's logic on due process rights and procedure to legal minors and overturning the existing paradigm of parens patriae in which the state had usurped the parental role. Writing the majority decision in Kent v. United States (1966), the first Supreme Court case that evaluated a juvenile court procedure, Fortas suggested that the existing system might be "the worst of both worlds."

At that time, the state was held to have a paternal interest in the child rather than a prosecutorial one, a concept that dispensed with the obligation to provide a child accused of a crime with the opportunity to make a defense. Still, courts were empowered to decide, in the interests of the child, to have the child incarcerated for lengthy periods or otherwise severely punished.

Fortas elaborated on his critique the following year in the case of In re Gault (1967). The case concerned a 15-year-old who had been sentenced to almost six years (until his 21st birthday) in the Arizona State Industrial School for making an obscene phone call to his neighbor. Had he been an adult, the maximum punishment he could have received was a $50.00 fine or two months in jail.

Fortas used the case to launch a ferocious attack on the juvenile justice system and parens patriae. His majority opinion was a landmark, extending the Fourteenth Amendment's guarantees of right to sufficient notice, right to counsel, right to confrontation of witnesses, and right against self-incrimination to certain juvenile proceedings.

Two years later, Fortas wrote another landmark in children's rights with the decision in the case of Tinker v. Des Moines Independent Community School District, involving two high school students and one junior high school student who had been suspended for wearing black armbands to school to protest the Vietnam War. Extending First Amendment rights to school students for the first time, Fortas wrote that neither "students or teachers shed their constitutional rights to freedom of speech or expression at the schoolhouse gate".

Epperson v. Arkansas

In 1968, Fortas persuaded the court to accept the appeal of Little Rock Central High School teacher Sue Epperson who had challenged Arkansas' anti-evolution law with the support of the state teachers union. Epperson had won the case, but the Arkansas Supreme Court had overturned the ruling.

Although the Court agreed quickly after hearing the case that the Arkansas ruling should be reversed, there was no consensus as to why, most Justices favoring fairly narrow grounds. Fortas was the architect and the author of the broader landmark majority opinion in Epperson v. Arkansas that emerged, banning religiously based creation narratives from public school science curricula.

Presidential power
Fortas believed in an expanded executive branch and a less powerful legislative branch. He wrote: "The enormous growth of presidential power from Franklin D. Roosevelt to Lyndon Johnson was a necessary and an inevitable adaptation of our constitutional system to national needs."

Nomination to be Chief Justice
On June 26, 1968, Johnson nominated Fortas as Chief Justice of the United States, to succeed Earl Warren, who had submitted his resignation effective with the confirmation of a successor. Anticipating that conservative members of the Senate would have concerns about Fortas's liberal opinions, Johnson simultaneously announced that he would fill the vacancy created by Fortas's elevation with United States Court of Appeals for the Fifth Circuit Judge Homer Thornberry of Texas. The propriety of the coordinated resignation-nomination on the eve of the November presidential election was called into question by Republican candidate Richard Nixon and the media. By the time the Judiciary Committee opened hearings on the nomination on July 11, bi-partisan opposition to the nomination (among Republicans and Southern Democrats) had become well organized. Fortas was the first sitting associate justice, nominated for chief justice, ever to appear before the Senate. He underwent four days of questioning about his legal career, judicial philosophy, and his relationship with President Johnson. Judiciary Committee chairman James Eastland told Johnson he "had never seen so much feeling against a man as against Fortas".

Antisemitism likely played a role in the confirmation battle. Afterward, Eastland reportedly said "After [Thurgood] Marshall, I could not go back to Mississippi if a Jewish chief justice swore in the next president." The National Socialist White People's Party undertook a phone campaign that summer condemning Fortas as a "despicable Jew with a 'red' record that smells to high heaven." Such attacks were soundly condemned by most senators. Even so, the White House began alerting the press to growing antisemitic opposition against Fortas, and used the issue to garner support for him among the senators. Fortas himself called the effort to defeat his nomination, "anti-Negro, anti-liberal, anti-civil rights, [and] anti-Semitic."

American University payments
Fortas's acceptance of $15,000 for nine speaking engagements at American University's Washington College of Law became a source of controversy. The money had come not from the university but from private sources that represented business interests connected to 40 companies; Senator Strom Thurmond raised the idea that cases involving these companies might come to the Court, and Fortas might not be objective. While the fee was legal, the size of the fee raised much concern about the Court's insulation from private interests, especially as it was funded by former clients and partners of Fortas. The $15,000 represented more than 40 percent of a Supreme Court justice's salary at the time, and was seven times what any other American University seminar leader had ever been paid.

Fortas Film Festival
Thurmond also hammered at the issue of pornography. He condemned Fortas for voting with the majority to overturn obscenity laws dealing with pornographic films. Thurmond obtained some of the films in question and played them in the Senate building while the hearings were out of session. These showings became the known as "Fortas Film Festival", and the association of Fortas with some of the films' strip-teases and especially the rape or homosexual sex depicted in one called Flaming Creatures was effective in tarnishing Fortas's image and disheartening his supporters.

Cloture vote
It was not until September 17, that the Judiciary Committee took a final vote on the nomination, reporting it favorably by an 11 to 6 vote to the full Senate. Thurmond promised to filibuster, and when the senate debate began on September 25, Fortas's opponents restated every criticism they had directed against Fortas, especially with regard to the issue of obscenity. Johnson remained resolute in his support for his nominee, saying to an aide: "We won't withdraw the nomination. I won't do that to Abe."

The debate lasted for four days until a cloture motion to end the debate was made. The 45–43 vote in favor of cloture demonstrated that the nomination was in trouble. It was 14 votes short of the two-thirds majority (59 votes) needed to cut off debate and force a vote on the nomination. (35 Democrats and 10 Republicans voted to end debate, while 24 Republicans and 19 Democrats voted to continue it.) Although the vote suggested to Fortas's supporters that a slim majority favored confirmation, it effectively derailed the nomination. In light of the slim prospect for a positive outcome, Johnson withdrew the nomination.

News accounts at the time consistently described the Senate floor debate as a filibuster intended to prevent the nomination from reaching the floor, where a simple-majority vote would have been enough for confirmation. Republican Senator John Cornyn asserted in 2003, however, that several senators who opposed Fortas asserted at the time they were not conducting a perpetual filibuster and were not trying to prevent a final up-or-down vote from occurring. Public debate occasionally still occurs over whether Fortas would have been confirmed in a simple majority vote. The Fortas vote is seen as an early precedent for later filibusters of judicial nominees.

Richard Nixon won the 1968 presidential election, and Johnson did not make another nomination before his term as president ended on January 20, 1969. Earl Warren was succeeded as chief justice by Warren Burger, who was sworn into office on June 23, 1969.

Ethics scandal and resignation
Fortas remained an associate justice, but in 1969, a new scandal arose. Fortas had accepted a US$20,000 retainer from the family foundation of Wall Street financier Louis Wolfson, a friend and former client, in January 1966. In return for unspecified advice, it was to pay Fortas $20,000 a year for the rest of Fortas's life (and then pay his widow for the rest of her life). However, in order to avoid apparent impropriety, Fortas returned the money the same year and received no further payments. Fortas was not unique in receiving this type of funding and other Justices had similar arrangements. William O. Douglas, Fortas's mentor, likewise received funding from casino magnate Albert Parvin through his own foundation. The American Bar Association revamped its rules as a result of the Wolfson affair, revising circumstances under which judges should not accept outside income.

Wolfson was under investigation for securities violations at the time, and it was alleged that he expected that his arrangement with Fortas would help him stave off criminal charges or help him secure a presidential pardon. He asked Fortas to help him secure a pardon from Johnson, which Fortas claimed that he did not do. Fortas recused himself from Wolfson's case when it came before the Court.

In May 1969, Life magazine chronicled Fortas's tangled relations with Wolfson. The revelation engendered calls for Fortas to be impeached, and motivated Richard Nixon, who knew that Fortas's resignation would enable the appointment of a more conservative Justice, ordered the Justice Department to investigate Fortas. Nixon was unsure if an investigation or prosecution was legal, but was convinced by then-Assistant Attorney General and future Chief Justice William Rehnquist that it would be. Chief Justice Earl Warren (who, like the other Justices, was unaware of Nixon's actions) urged Fortas to resign to protect the reputation of the Court and avoid impeachment proceedings, as did Justice Hugo Black. However, when Fortas said it would "kill" his wife, Black changed his mind, realized that Nixon wanted Fortas off the Court for political reasons, and urged Fortas not to resign. Nonetheless, Fortas ultimately decided resignation would be best for him and for his wife's legal career after Attorney General John N. Mitchell threatened to prosecute him, and potentially investigate his wife for tax evasion.  On the subject of his resignation,  William J. Brennan later said, "We were just stunned." Fortas later said he "resigned to save Douglas," another justice who was being investigated for a similar scandal at the same time. Fortas resigned from the Court on May 14, 1969. When the Justice Department heard the news, the Attorney General's office celebrated, and Nixon called to congratulate them.

In 1970, Louis Wolfson surreptitiously taped a private telephone call with Fortas. The transcript of this call was disclosed by Wolfson's lawyer, Bernard Fensterwald, to Washington Post reporter Bob Woodward in 1977. The Washington Post subsequently published several excerpts from the transcript, including language suggesting that Fortas might indeed have spoken with President Johnson about a pardon for Wolfson, but there is no evidence that it was a quid pro quo rather than a voluntary intervention for a friend. Wolfson was convicted of violating federal securities laws later that year and spent time in prison.

Fortas's seat on the Supreme Court was vacant until June 1970, when Harry Blackmun was sworn into office. This was Nixon's third attempt to fill the vacancy. His earlier failed nominations were of Clement Haynsworth in September 1969 and G. Harrold Carswell in February 1970.

Later years
Rebuffed in the wake of his fall by the powerful Washington law firm he had founded, Fortas founded another firm, Fortas and Koven, and maintained a successful law practice until his death in 1982. However, his wife, Carolyn Agger, stayed at Fortas's original firm, in part due to the fact that Fortas had resigned in order to protect her job there. In the year following his resignation, he turned down an offer to publish his memoirs.

At Fortas & Koven, Fortas also kept two notable non-paying clients: preeminent cellist/composer Pablo Casals and Lyndon Johnson. Johnson and Fortas remained great friends, with the latter often visiting the former president at his ranch near Stonewall, Texas, until his death in 1973. Fortas was asked to donate his papers to Johnson's presidential library by Lady Bird Johnson, but he replied that his correspondence with Johnson had always been kept in strictest confidence. According to his law partner Howard Koven, Fortas once consulted with Martin Scorsese on the legality of language Scorsese wanted to use in a movie.

A portrait of him was placed in Yale Law School while he was still alive, underwritten by an anonymous donor. Fortas served as a longtime member of the board of directors of Carnegie Hall, including while he was on the Supreme Court. He also served on the board of the Kennedy Center since its opening in 1964.

In the course of his return to private practice, Fortas sometimes appeared before his former colleagues at the Supreme Court. On the first occasion he did so, his successor, Harry Blackmun, recalled that his eyes met Fortas's: "[Fortas] kind of nodded ... I wondered what was going through his mind". When Blackmun later questioned Fortas if he remembered the encounter, Fortas said he would "never forget it". Blackmun thought Fortas's attitude toward the new justice was remarkable, not showing "an ounce of antagonism or resentment."

Fortas died from a ruptured aorta on April 5, 1982. His memorial service was held at the Kennedy Center with Isaac Stern and Lady Bird Johnson in attendance.

Notes

See also 

 Demographics of the Supreme Court of the United States
 List of justices of the Supreme Court of the United States
 List of law clerks of the Supreme Court of the United States (Seat 2)
 List of United States Supreme Court justices by time in office
 United States Supreme Court cases during the Warren Court

References

Further reading
 Johnson, Robert David. "Lyndon B. Johnson and the Fortas Nomination." Journal of Supreme Court History 41.1 (2016): 103–122.
 Kalman, Laura. Abe Fortas: a biography (Yale UP, 1990), a major scholarly biography
 Krutz, Glen S., Richard Fleisher, and Jon R. Bond. "From Abe Fortas to Zoe Baird: Why some presidential nominations fail in the Senate." American Political Science Review 92.4 (1998): 871–881.
 Massaro, John. "LBJ and the Fortas Nomination for Chief Justice." Political Science Quarterly 97.4 (1982): 603–621. online
  Murphy, Bruce Allen. Fortas: The Rise and Ruin of a Supreme Court Justice (1988)

External links

 Hatching a New Filibuster Precedent – Findlaw article by John Dean on the Fortas nomination filibuster.
 FBI file on Abe Fortas
 Supreme Court Justices – Abe Fortas
 
 Abe Fortas Papers (MS 858). Manuscripts and Archives, Yale University Library.
 Oral History Interview with Abe Fortas, from the Lyndon Baines Johnson Library

1910 births
1982 deaths
20th-century American lawyers
20th-century American judges
American people of Russian-Jewish descent
American legal scholars
Jewish American government officials
People from Memphis, Tennessee
Public Works Administration
Rhodes College alumni
Justices of the Supreme Court of the United States
United States federal judges appointed by Lyndon B. Johnson
Washington, D.C., Democrats
Lawyers from Washington, D.C.
Yale Law School alumni
Arnold & Porter people
People from Georgetown (Washington, D.C.)